Ponga is a town and municipality in the province and autonomous community of Asturias, northwestern Spain. Its capital is San Juan de Beleño.

Ecology
Ponga has a natural park.

Also, "Ponga-Amieva" is the name of a Special Protection Area for wild birds.

History
Several archaeological remains show evidence that it was inhabited in the Bronze Age. During Roman colonization, Ponga belonged to the territory of Cantabria. The first documented reference of Ponga occurred in the time of Alfonso IX of León.

Parishes
There are nine parishes (administrative division):

Culture

Art
Among the most notable art displays are in rural churches including:
 Church of Santa Maria de Taranes (1779)
 Church of St. Mary of Viego
 Church of St. John of Bethlehem (17th century)
 Ermitas Ventaniella and Arcenorio
 Bucket Tower
 Sobrefoz Palace
 Spa Mestas

Holidays and festivals
 January 1: Feast of Aguinaldo and Guirria in San Juan de Belen. 
 Carnival Saturday: Aguinaldo de Sellaño
 Holy Saturday: Market in the Trasiegu Sobrefoz.
 May 13: Contest of cheese and Ponga Beyos days Beyos Cheese
 Around May 15: San Isidro San Juan de Henbane
 July 1: San Pedro in Sobrefoz
 July 16: Ntra Sra del Carmen San Juan de Belen
 31 July: Feast of San Ignacio and Carangas Beyos
 August 4, 5 and 6: Ntra Sra de las Nieves in Ladle and Sellaño
 August 9: San Justo in Cadenava
 August 10 and 11: San Lorenzo in Abiego
 August 15 and 16: in Mrs Nra Taranes and Viego
 Last weekend of August: The Arándanu in Bedules
 September 1: La Santina de Ventaniella in Ventaniella
 September 8: La Santina de Arcenoriu in Arcenoriu
 Last weekend in November: Gastronomic Days of Hunting in the entire council

References

External links
Rural house in Ponga - Casa Severa

Municipalities in Asturias